Juan Ramón Melecio Machuca (May 29, 1934 – February 9, 2022) was a Puerto Rican lawyer who was the longest-serving Director of the Office of Legislative Services of Puerto Rico, from 1981 to 1988. He was subsequently appointed a Superior Court judge by Governor Rafael Hernández Colón.

Political career
Earned a Juris Doctor from the University of Puerto Rico School of Law. In the 1990s he was nominated as a tri-partisan consensus candidate to serve as chairman of the Puerto Rico State Elections Commission. Served in the United States Army.

A former member of the pro-status quo Popular Democratic Party, he surprised political observers in 2003 when he announced his conversion as a statehooder and accepted an invitation to serve as the chairman of former Governor Pedro Rosselló's 2004 campaign to return to the Governor's Mansion, La Fortaleza, for a third non-consecutive term.

He served as senior advisor to the gubernatorial campaign of former Resident Commissioner Luis Fortuño, who was Rosselló's successful running mate when the former governor lost in 2004, and was subsequently appointed by Governor Fortuño to head Puerto Rico's Trade Office in the Dominican Republic.

He was one of a handful of politicians who served in all three branches of the Government of Puerto Rico, the Legislative, Judicial and Executive branches.

Early life
Melecio was born on May 29, 1934 in Vega Alta, Puerto Rico and raised by his paternal grandmother.

Death
He died on February 9, 2022, at the age of 87. Was inserted at the Puerto Rico National Cemetery in Bayamón, Puerto Rico.

Legacy
The Puerto Rico State Elections Commission building in San Juan, Puerto Rico was named Juan R. Melecio.

References

External links
Oficina de Servicios Legislativos | Asamblea Legislativa de Puerto Rico

1934 births
2022 deaths
Political office-holders in Puerto Rico
Popular Democratic Party (Puerto Rico) politicians
Puerto Rican lawyers
Puerto Rican Army personnel
People from Vega Alta, Puerto Rico
University of Puerto Rico alumni
United States Army soldiers